Evangelos Venizelos (born 1 January 1957) is a Greek academic and politician who was Deputy Prime Minister of Greece and Minister for Foreign Affairs from 25 June 2013 to 27 January 2015. Previously, he was Deputy Prime Minister and Minister for Finance of Greece from 17 June 2011 to 21 March 2012. He was a member of the Hellenic Parliament for the Panhellenic Socialist Movement (PASOK) for the first electoral district of Thessaloniki. He is a Professor of Constitutional Law at the Law School of the Aristotle University of Thessaloniki.

On 18 March 2012, Venizelos was elected unopposed to replace George Papandreou as PASOK president and led the party in the May 2012 general election as well as the June 2012 general election.

Early life and education
Evangelos Venizelos was born in Thessaloniki on 1 January 1957. He is unrelated to his famous namesake, Eleftherios Venizelos. He is married to Lila A. Bakatselou and has a daughter. He was an undergraduate at the Aristotle University of Thessaloniki from 1974 through 1978 and completed postgraduate studies at Panthéon-Assas University in France. In 1980, he received his PhD in Law from the Aristotle University of Thessaloniki.

Besides his mother tongue, Greek, he speaks French and English.

Early career
Venizelos is the author of a number of books, monographs and papers, including most recently Agenda 16 ( in 2007, a collection of writings about the future of the university system in Greece, including some articles previously published on the web.  Other writings have dealt with current political issues and the media, foreign policy, and developmental policy. His recent works focus more on political theory and cultural issues. He strongly opposes the clash of civilizations theory, and has written extensively about the Greek "civilization of civilizations" (Venizelos, 2001).

Political career
As a student, Venizelos served on the Central Council of the Student Union of the University of Thessaloniki (FEAPT) in 1977, and the National Student Union of Greece (EFEE) in 1975.

Member of Parliament
Venizelos was elected as a PASOK MP in the Thessaloniki A constituency in the general elections of 1993, 1996, 2000, 2004, 2007 and 2009. He has been a member of the parliamentary committee for the Revision of the Constitution, on which he was spokesman for the majority party in the parliaments elected in 1993, 1996, 2000, 2004 and 2007. He was also a member of the Standing Committees on National Defence and Foreign Affairs, on Public Administration, Public Order and Justice and on European Affairs.

In parliament, Venizelos currently serves on the Special Permanent Committee on Institutions and Transparency and on the Special Permanent Committee on monitoring the decisions of the European Court of Human Rights.

In addition to his role in parliament, Venizelos has been serving as member of the Greek delegation to the Parliamentary Assembly of the Council of Europe since 2016. A member of the Socialists, Democrats and Greens Group, he serves on the Committee on Legal Affairs and Human Rights; its Sub-Committee on the implementation of judgments of the European Court of Human Rights; the Committee on Rules of Procedure, Immunities and Institutional Affairs; and Committee on the Election of Judges to the European Court of Human Rights.

He has been a member of the PASOK Central Committee since 1990. In the past he was a member of the PASOK Executive Bureau.

Member of the Government
Venizelos has held the following government posts:
Deputy Minister to the Presidency, and government spokesman, 13 October 1993 to 8 July 1994
Minister for the Press and the Media, and government spokesman, 8 July 1994 to 15 September 1995
Minister for Transport and Communications, 15 September 1995 to 22 January 1996
Minister for Justice, 22 January to 5 September 1996
Minister for Culture, 25 September 1996 to 19 February 1999
Minister for Development, 19 January 1999 to 13 April 2000
Minister for Culture, 21 November 2000 to 10 March 2004
Minister for Finance, 17 June 2011 to 21 March 2012
Deputy Prime Minister, 17 June 2011 to 21 March 2012
Deputy Prime Minister and Minister for Foreign Affairs, from 25 June 2013 to 27 January 2015.

After the legislative elections of 2007, in which PASOK was soundly defeated, Venizelos announced his candidacy for the leadership of the party. In the leadership election, held on 11 November 2007, Venizelos was defeated by incumbent party leader George Papandreou, receiving 38.18% of the vote against 55.91% for Papandreou.

When named by Papandreou to the finance and deputy PM positions in June 2011, Venizelos said "'I am leaving defense today to go to the real battle' to reduce Europe’s biggest debt load – almost 1 1/2 times the size of its economy." David Marsh of London and Oxford Capital Markets in MarketWatch wrote that both "German parliamentarians who voted solidly earlier this month to involve private-sector creditors in the next bail-out package", which Angela Merkel has now dropped as a precondition, and "Greece’s politicians and people, who must bow to further austerity as the price for fresh external support", were central as "the stage now shifts to further players in the theatre of Greek affairs." And "[n]obody knows whether the burly new Finance Minister Evangelos Venizelos will put in a starring role or turn out merely as a transitory figure."

On 1 June 2019 Venizelos left PASOK and KINAL in protest against the political line of the new leader Fofi Gennimata.

Controversy
Venizelos was active in the Macedonia naming dispute, when elements in Greece opposed the use of the name "Macedonia" by the newly independent neighbouring Republic of Macedonia. Columnist Mark Dragoumis of Athens News opined that, "[i]n February 1994, as minister of information, [Venizelos] was instrumental in convincing the ailing Prime Minister Andreas Papandreou to impose that idiotic 'embargo' on the country later named FYROM." Dragoumis maintained that Venizelos' motivation was to gain "nationalist votes in his Thessaloniki constituency".

Dragoumis also criticised Venizelos for helping pass a law – "in order to boost [his] popularity among Greek republicans" – to impose a requirement on King Constantine II, former king of the Hellenes, and his family if they wanted to be granted Greek nationality. The requirement was to submit a declaration that they "unreservedly respected the 1975 Constitution and accepted and recognised the Hellenic Republic". The columnist termed it a "silly precondition – reminiscent of the 'declarations of repentance' that Greek leftists were obliged to sign under pressure during the civil war and after". Ultimately, the law proved irrelevant once Greece signed the Schengen Agreement allowing the ex-king to travel to Greece via Italy without having to pass through Greek immigration.

Notes

References

External links 
  
 
 Position papers, two books (full text, in Greek)

|-

|-

|-

|-

|-

|-

|-

|-

|-

|-

|-

|-

1957 births
Deputy Prime Ministers of Greece
Foreign ministers of Greece
Culture ministers of Greece
Finance ministers of Greece
Greek government-debt crisis
20th-century Greek lawyers
Greek MPs 1993–1996
Greek MPs 1996–2000
Greek MPs 2000–2004
Greek MPs 2004–2007
Greek MPs 2007–2009
Greek MPs 2009–2012
Greek MPs 2012 (May)
Greek MPs 2012–2014
Greek MPs 2015 (February–August)
Greek MPs 2015–2019
MPs of Thessaloniki
Justice ministers of Greece
Leaders of PASOK
Living people
Ministers of National Defence of Greece
Paris 2 Panthéon-Assas University alumni
Politicians from Thessaloniki